Anaximander was a Greek philosopher.

Anaximander may also refer to:
Anaximander crater on the Moon
Anaximander (trilobite), a trilobite genus in the family Olenidae
Anaximander Mountains, a submerged mountain range in the Hellenic Trench